Akram al-Homsi is the Regional Secretary of the Jordanian Regional Command of the Jordanian branch of the Ba'ath Party.

References

Living people
Members of the Jordanian Regional Branch of the Ba'ath Party
Year of birth missing (living people)
Himsi family
Place of birth missing (living people)